Masterpiece Playhouse is an American dramatic anthology series that aired in summer 1950 on NBC from 9 to 10 p.m. Eastern time on Sundays. It was summer replacement for The Philco-Goodyear Television Playhouse.

It consisted of seven live 60 minute adaptations of the plays Hedda Gabler (July 23, 1950), The Rivals (August 6, 1950), Richard III (July 30, 1950), Six Characters in Search of an Author (August 13, 1950), The Importance of Being Earnest, Uncle Vanya (September 3, 1950), and Othello (August 27, 1950).  Its stars included Jessica Tandy, William Windom, Boris Karloff, Eva Gabor, Walter Abel, and Margaret Lindsay.  

The producer was Curtis Canfield. Among its directors were William Corrigan and Delbert Mann, later Oscar winner for directing the film Marty.

References

External links

1950 American television series debuts
1950 American television series endings
1950s American anthology television series
NBC original programming
American live television series